The 1984 John Player Special League was the sixteenth competing of what was generally known as the Sunday League.  The competition was won for the second time by Essex County Cricket Club.

Standings

Batting averages

Bowling averages

See also
Sunday League

References

John Player
Pro40